R4 is an expressway in the north–south direction in eastern Slovakia.

It goes from border with Poland and ending at border with Hungary. It goes through or around Svidník, Prešov and Košice.
The section between Prešov and Košické Oľšany is shared with D1 and sections between Košické Oľšany and Haniska with R2. The road is part of the proposed Via Carpatia route.

From the total length of 73.9 km (excluding shared sections), these sections are in operation:

 4.6 km Svidník bypass (two-lane) 
 14.2 km Haniska - Milhosť
Under Construction:

Prešov northern bypass - Part I or Prešov, North - Prešov, West, opens in July 2023

Haniska - Košické Oľšany or Košice, Šaca - Košické Oľšany, Part II opens in 2025 (R2 expressway, concurrent with R4)

Overview of the expressway R4

Future of construction 

=== Prešov northern bypass, part I  (Prešov, north - Prešov, west) ===

Section Prešov, northern bypass II. part (Section Kapušany - Prešov, north)

Sections

Vyšný Komárnik (Border crossing SK/PL) – Hunkovce 
The beginning of this section, planned in a half profile of category R 24.5/100, is located on the state border with Poland near the village of Vyšný Komárnik. There will also be a large rest area intended mainly for transit traffic. Beyond the border crossing, there will be an interchange with a connection to I/21 and the Polish expressway S19. The next intersection will be located at the end of the section near the village of Hunkovce. On the total length of the section of approximately 8 kilometers, 7 bridge structures will be built directly on the body of the R4 and another four outside the expressway.

Hunkovce – Ladomirová 
The section with a length of 8.2 km is planned in a half profile of category R 24.5/100. It will pass east of the villages of Hunkovce and Ladomirová and will mainly divert freight and transit traffic from the I/21 road. The construction will include fourteen bridge structures, an ecoduct, the completion of the intersection "Svidník-sever" and a temporary connection to the previous section. Currently, the public procurement process for the contractor of the Documentation for the building permit, Documentation for the offer, Copyright supervision and performance of the Coordinator for the documentation is underway.

Svidník bypass 
The bypass of the city of Svidník with a length of 4.573 kilometers has been under construction since December 2007. The road here is currently built in a half-profile (category R 11.5/100 or R 22.5/100) and has diverted traffic from the inner city and thus lightened the road I/21. There are 9 bridges and a level crossing "Svidník - South" and a level connection "Svidník - North". The maximum permitted speed on the section is set at 100 km/h (62 mph).

The construction was originally supposed to be completed in May 2009, but there were problems with landslides of the embankment under the road, which needed to be rehabilitated. The construction work had to continue and the section was opened to traffic only on December 20, 2010. The contractor was the association of companies Inžinierske stavby, a. s., Strabag s. r. about. and Eurovia SK a. s.

Svidník – Kapušany 
The R4 expressway between Kapušany and Svidník did not have a fixed route for a long time. There were 2 concepts for its route, namely along the existing road I/21 (formerly I/73) around Giraltoviec (red variant), or around Hanušovice, Domaše and Stropkovo (blue variant). The irony of fate is that these colors did not only mark a line on the map of the study that came up with these variants, but were also alternately preferred, blue during the so-called "blue", i.e. j. right-wing governments (2. Dzurind's government and Radič's government) and red during the "red" governments, i.e. j. governments that Robert Fico assembled as a representative of the left party. This alternation of variants was not helped either by the original final opinion from 2009, which stated the equivalence of both variants and thus left the choice to a political decision. The definitive was probably determined by the so-called the feasibility study, which was prepared in 2015 by the company HBH projekt and which recommended implementing R4 in the so-called new red variant, i.e. j. along the current road I/21. However, this resulting variant is not quite the same as the original red one, the biggest change is the routing of the R4 between Lipníki and Radom slightly to the west, thanks to which the directional conditions have improved, but mainly to the omission of three short tunnels. On September 21, 2015, a public tender was announced for the contractor of the report on the environmental assessment of the construction for the Kapušany - Lipníky, Kuková - Giraltovce and Radom - Rakovčík sections, which confirmed the results of the aforementioned feasibility study and subsequently determined the phasing of this, less than 40 km long section, as follows:
 Kapušany – Lipníky
 Lipníky – Kuková
 Kuková – Giraltovce
 Giraltovce – Radoma
 Radoma – Rakovčik
 Rakovčík – Svidník south.

The R 24.5/100 category is proposed for the entire section, but between Lipník and Svidník, due to low intensities, R4 should only be built in a half profile.

Prešov, Northern bypass 
The northern bypass of Prešov will be 14.5 km long. This part of R4 solves the connection of D1 with the section of R4 between Kapušany and Svidník. The section will also improve traffic in the city. It was divided into two sections, while each of the sections will be implemented separately.

Prešov, northern bypass, Part I 

The section will be 4.3 km long. The Bikoš tunnel (1,155 m), 3 bridges on the expressway, 3 bridges on the branches of the intersection and 3 bridges outside the body of the expressway will be located here. Part of the construction is also the reconstruction of the existing road I/68 in the location of MÚK Prešov - North into a 4-lane divided road. The proposed category is R 24.5/100, in tunnels 2T 7.5/100 in full profile. Construction is currently underway by the association of Váhostav and TuCon with the contractual termination in March 2023, in fact the section will be opened to traffic with a delay of three or four months.

Prešov, northern bypass, Part II 
The section will be 10.2 km long. The tender for the contractor was announced on March 1, 2022.

Košice – Milhosť 
This section connects the regional city of Košice with the state border with Hungary near the village of Milhosť. This part of the R4 measures 14.2 km and is built entirely in full profile. Construction officially began on August 27, 2010, and the entire section was handed over for use on November 7, 2013. The construction costs reached the amount of €78 million, the state expertise initially considered a price of €117 million. The section is also part of the V.A Pan-European Corridor. There are 16 bridges and 2 level crossings on the route. Due to the construction of this section of the R4, it was necessary to partially modify the road I/68. For the construction of this section, which was designed by Dopravoprojekt, a.s. with Prešov division and implemented by Skanska SK, a.s., category R 24.5/120 was used (with the exception of the section Kechnec - the border with Hungary, where due to the respect of the crossing point on the state border, the route must lead through a "stepping stone" complying with the design speed of only 100 km/h). The dominant feature of the section is the 530 m long bridge over the ŽSR broad-gauge line, whose main span with a span of 80 m was made with fly-in concrete.

See also 

 Controlled-access highway
 Highways in Slovakia
 Transport in Slovakia

References

External links
 Highways portal by INEKO Institute (slovak)
 R4 exits

Highways in Slovakia